Kamrup Ki Kahani is an Indian soap opera that aired in the 1990s, directed by Ruma Ghosh.

Plot
Set in Palashbari, Kamrup, Kamrup Ki Kahani divulges the story of a young Brahmin widow and society around her. It narrates her struggle between two worlds, traditionalism and liberalism.

Crew
Director: Ruma Ghosh

Cast

See also
 Ramayan, 1987 TV series
 Mahabharat, 1988 TV series
 Shaktimaan

References

DD National original programming
Indian television soap operas
1990s Indian television series
Television shows based on Indian novels
Television shows set in Assam